Calophyllum obscurum is a species of flowering plant in the Calophyllaceae family. It is found only in Solomon Islands.

References

Flora of the Solomon Islands (archipelago)
Vulnerable plants
obscurum
Endemic flora of the Solomon Islands
Taxonomy articles created by Polbot